Legislative elections were held in Macau on 23 September 2001.

Results

Members
Directly-elected members
1. Antonio Ng (ANMD, with 16,961 votes)
2. Kwan Tsui Hang (UPD, with 12,990 votes) 
3. Leong Heng Teng (UPP, 11.276 votes) 
4. Chow Kam Fai, David (CODEM, with 10,016 votes) 
5. Vitor Cheung Lup Kwan ( ARSEM, with 9,955 votes) 
6. Au Kam San (ANMD, with 8,480.5 votes) 
7. Leong Iok Wa ( UPD, with 6,495 votes) 
8. Iong Weng Ian (UPP, with 5,638 votes) 
9. João Bosco Cheang (AEA, with 5,170 votes) 
10. Jorge Manuel Fão (CODEM, with 5,008 votes)

Members for indirect returned of the Legislative Assembly in the second term:
Chan Chak Mo and Fong Chi Keong (DCAR –Group representing welfare, cultural, educational and sports interests: with 1 364 votes) 
Susana Chou, Hoi Sai Iun, Kou Hoi In and Cheang Chi Keong (OMKC Group representing business: with 279 votes) 
Lao Cheok Va and Tong Chi Kin (CCCAE Group representing labor: with 261 votes) 
Chui Sai Cheong and Leonel Alberto Alves (OMCY Group representing professional: with 188 votes)

External links
 Official website 
 Official website 
 Official results

Elections in Macau
Macau
Legislative
Macau